The Séminaire Saint-Joseph de Trois-Rivières is a private scholar institution in the Quebec region of Mauricie. Located in Trois-Rivières, Quebec, Canada, it is, within the unique Quebec education system, a secondary school. Historically religious, it is now relatively secular but still holds many links with the religious and its community.

History

The roots of the Séminaire are found in 1860, when was founded the Collège des Trois-Rivières. Saint Joseph was then chosen as patron saint and Religion et Patrie (or Religioni et Patriae, referring to the Christian faith and the Quebec homeland) as motto.

In 1874, the college is given to the care of the Trois-Rivières diocese. The latter makes it then its own diocese seminary and bestows upon it the denomination of Séminaire Saint-Joseph des Trois-Rivières. The old tradition of calling the city les Trois-Rivières (plural grammatical inflection) now being obsolete, Séminaire Saint-Joseph de Trois-Rivières is now the proper way to call the institution.

The STR offered the classical course of the former Quebec educational system until the end of the 1967–1968 scholar year. It officially became a secondary school in September 1968. It became a co-education school in 1998 while, as a boarding school, continuing to provide dormitory residence to male students.

Architecture

The current massive building that houses the institution was built in 1929 and constitutes an example of pure neoclassical architecture. A new house for the seminary was made necessary by the destruction by fire of the former building in the same year, on the same present estate of the Laviolette Boulevard. The modern building was actually built around the chapel it now harbours.

The structure is mainly consisted of grey Quebec Beauce granite. The high and impressive facade is dominated by a large dome of bronze. The large main doors were designed by the French ironwork artist that created the Monument of the Flame beneath the Arc de Triomphe of Paris. Like the school arms, the doors display symbols of the Christian religion and of Quebec, an embodiment of the motto "Religion et patrie". The presence, above the door, of a Saint Joseph statue and a mast displaying the flag of Quebec also underlines the motto of the school.

Musée Pierre Boucher

The main exposition areas of the Musée Pierre Boucher are found at the very main central entrance of the building. The museum preserves 7,500 works of art of all eras, paintings, drawings, prints, sculptures and fine arts, as well as 13,000 artifacts illustrating the religious history of the diocese, of the city and the region and the life and customs of the 19th and 20th century. The Museum is affiliated with: CMA,  CHIN and Virtual Museum of Canada.  It is named after Pierre Boucher, an early Canadian settler who studied under and worked with the Jesuit missions in Georgian Bay. Boucher was twice governor of Trois Rivieres, and the first Canadian settler to be ennobled under King Louis XIV.

Archives

The Séminare houses a major service of historical archives, an important gateway to Trois-Rivières and Mauricie history. The Service des archives du Séminaire de Trois-Rivières (ASTR) traces its own origins to 1918, when the authorities of the seminary asked a young priest, Abbot Albert Tessier, to act as archivist.

Since 1929, the mandate of the archives center was broadened to the preservation and diffusion of more than 760 collections of private archives from individuals, families and organizations of the surrounding region. These documents include correspondence, photographs, postal cards and historical notes. They are accessible for free to all citizens.

Further information

It is known under more than one name: the "Séminaire Saint-Joseph", the "Séminaire de Trois-Rivières" and, simply, the "STR". It not only houses the Archives and the Museum, but also a chapel, and a full wing of living quarters for the religious community. It is also well known for setting up a yearly musical school play of professional scope.

Its students are colloquially and affectionately known as les suisses, a reference to the stripes of a former school uniform that made the wearer resemble a chipmunk, or un suisse in Quebec French (notably). Coincidentally, the name suisse was given to the chipmunk (or tamia in international normative French) because of the similarity of their stripes  to the striped cloth of the Vatican Swiss Guard uniform.

Notable alumni
Richard Béliveau - Cancer prevention researcher
Jean Chrétien - 20th Prime Minister of Canada
Pierre de Bané - federal cabinet minister and Senator
Maurice Duplessis - 16th Premier of Quebec
Gaétan Frigon - Entrepreneur and TV personality
Gérald Gagnier - bandmaster, composer, and trumpeter
Gérald Godin - Poet and Parti Québécois MNA
François Massicotte - Humorist
Laurent Poliquin - Poet
Denis Villeneuve - Film director

See also

Trois-Rivières
Mauricie
Education in Quebec

References

L'historique du STR
Archives of the Séminaire de Trois-Rivières

External links

Virtual visit of the building
Musée Pierre Boucher - official site
Musée Pierre Boucher - partner site at Séminaire Saint-Joseph de Trois-Rivières

High schools in Quebec
Art museums and galleries in Quebec
Private schools in Quebec
Schools in Trois-Rivières
Tourist attractions in Mauricie
Museums in Mauricie
1860 establishments in Canada